Bertrand Burgalat 

Born:  July 1963

French musician, composer and producer.

Background 
Bertrand Burgalat was born in the Corsican town of Bastia in 1963. His father, a high-ranking civil servant, was the sub-prefect of the island at the time, but as often happens in this profession, the Burgalat family moved several times in the course of Burgalat senior's career, so young Bertrand grew up in several different towns in France. Obsessed with Classical Music from an early age, Burgalat apparently became fascinated with the possibilities of pop music after seeing Pink Floyd in concert when he was 10 years old.

He is married to fashion designer Vanessa Seward.

Work 
Burgalat is well known for his cool, breezy 1960s-style pop sound, something he has lent to his production work with Air, April March, A.S Dragon, Cinnamon, Dalcan, Jad Wio, Mick Harvey, Louis Philippe and the French writer Michel Houellebecq. His musical influences include the "yé-yé" sound of French pop made famous by France Gall, Françoise Hardy and Brigitte Fontaine, as well as the singers Jacques Dutronc and Serge Gainsbourg, as well as the 'folk-music of the Ruhr' created by Kraftwerk.  Reputed to possess one of the most acute ears in the business, 'BB' (a nickname he shares with Brigitte Bardot) also draws inspiration from 20th century French classical composers such as Maurice Ravel, Francis Poulenc and Olivier Messiaen, and was greatly influenced by the writings of cult French journalist-cum-pop visionary Yves Adrien.

At the age of 25, he produced the Laibach's album Let It Be, which is an entire cover of The Beatles' album of the same name.

In 1995, Burgalat remixed and rearranged the Renegade Soundwave song "Positive Mindscape" (as "Positive BB") for release on the "Positive Dub Mixes" CD single. In 2001,  he mixed a completely new version of  Depeche Mode "Easy Tiger" instrumental song from the album Exciter, the B-side of the single "Dream On".

His releases, The Ssssound of Mmmusic (2000) and Portrait-robot (2005) fused subtle electronica, psychedelia, soaring backing choruses and string sections with wry lyrics (some of them written by Philippe Katerine, April March and Alfreda Benge, Robert Wyatt's longtime companion), and finely crafted melodies. Burgalat is also an expert at using discords and dissonances in his harmonies, some of which bear more relation to avant-garde classical music than to pop. On his album, Bertrand Burgalat Meets A.S. Dragon (2001), Burgalat places his crooning style directly in contrast with A.S Dragon's hard-groove rock/jam-band sensibility.

Tricatel 
In 1995, Burgalat established his own record label, Tricatel, which has become synonymous with futuristic retro-chic, innovation and fierce attachment to its independent spirit, characteristics which are both natural to him, and derived from his fascination for labels like the Compact Organisation and él. This boutique label (whose very high profile in France has not yet been matched by commercial success) has helped define the "Burgalat sound", which has been billed as a French response to Phil Spector, and has been a major influence on acts such as Air and Daft Punk. Struggling with distribution problems, and despite the huge critical acclaim gained by many of its releases, Tricatel has downsized its activities over the past two years, concentrating on acts such as A.S. Dragon, new signing Les Shades, and Bertrand Burgalat himself, who is currently (January 2007) working on a follow-up to 'Portrait-Robot'. Other notable artists in the Tricatel catalogue include Swedish avant-pop trio Eggstone, The High Llamas, Ingrid Caven, and award-winning novelist Jonathan Coe, who teamed up with Louis Philippe and jazz pianist/double-bass player Danny Manners for the occasion. Tricatel has also released compilations of some of Burgalat's musical heroes, such as French composer André Popp and legendary English arranger and soundtrack composer David Whitaker. Bertrand Burgalat picked the name "Tricatel" from a successful French comedy of the 1970s, L'Aile ou la Cuisse, starring Louis de Funès and Coluche.

Discography
The Ssssound of Mmmusic (2000)
The Genius of Bertrand Burgalat (Bungalow, 2000)
Bertrand Burgalat Meets A.S Dragon (2001)
Palais Royal! (Original Soundtrack) (2007)
Portrait Robot (2005)
Inédits (2007)
Chéri B.B. (2007)
My Little Princess (Original Soundtrack) (2011)
Belleville-Tokyo (Original Soundtrack) (2011)
Toutes directions (2012)

External links

 Publisher website:  http://www.tricatel.com

References

French record producers
1963 births
Living people
People from Bastia
Officiers of the Ordre des Arts et des Lettres
People with type 1 diabetes